Magaz is a Spanish surname. Notable people with the surname include:

Alicia Magaz (born 1994), Spanish field hockey player
Esperanza Magaz (1922–2013), Cuban-born Venezuelan actress
Santos Magaz (born 1958), Spanish sprint canoer 

Surnames of Spanish origin